Sildi is a rural locality (a selo) in the Tsumadinsky District in the Republic of Dagestan, Russia. Population: Sildi is also located "approximately 1,932 meters above sea level". The village is amongst the Caucasus mountains in Russia. 
It is the hometown of retired, undefeated (29-0) UFC Lightweight champion Khabib Nurmagomedov, who is considered by many to be one of the greatest MMA fighters of all time as well as a member of the UFC Hall of Fame (Modern wing).

References

Rural localities in Tsumadinsky District